Constance Le Grip (born 14 November 1960) is a French politician, formerly of The Republican Group, who currently serves as a member of the 15th legislature of the French Fifth Republic, representing Hauts-de-Seine's 6th constituency. She served as a Member of the European Parliament from 2010 until 2017.

Early life
Le Grip was born on 14 November 1960 in Chatou.

Career
From 2001 to 2008, Le Grip served as a councilor in Neuilly-sur-Seine and has been a parliamentary adviser to Nicolas Sarkozy. She became a member of European Parliament in February 2010. A member of European People's Party (Christian Democrats), she served as the vice-president of the Committee on Constitutional Affairs and a member of Committee on Employment and Social Affairs. She was reelected to the European Parliament in 2014.

In the Republicans’ 2016 presidential primaries, Le Grip endorsed Nicolas Sarkozy as the party’s candidate for the office of President of France.

During the 2017 French legislative election with 21.16% votes, Le Grip took up the second position in the first round of elections for Hauts-de-Seine's 6th constituency  but secured 53.81% of the votes cast in the second round. In the National Assembly, she serves as vice-chairperson of the Committee on Cultural Affairs and Education and as member of the Committee on European Affairs. Since 2019, she has also been a member of the French delegation to the Franco-German Parliamentary Assembly.

In the Republicans’ 2017 leadership election, Le Grip endorsed Laurent Wauquiez. In 2018, Wauquiez included her in his shadow cabinet; in this capacity, she served as opposition counterpart to Minister of European Affairs Amélie de Montchalin.

In parliament, Le Grip co-authored (together with Pascal Bois) a 2021 report on the copyright law of France.

She joined Ensemble Citoyens in 2022, and ran in the 2022 French legislative election under the banner.

Political positions
In July 2019, Le Grip voted in favor of the French ratification of the European Union’s Comprehensive Economic and Trade Agreement (CETA) with Canada.

Ahead of the 2022 presidential elections, Le Grip publicly declared her support for Michel Barnier as the Republicans’ candidate.

Other activities
 French Digital Council (CNNum), Member

Personal life
Le Grip is married with three children.

References

1960 births
Living people
The Republicans (France) politicians
Deputies of the 15th National Assembly of the French Fifth Republic
MEPs for Île-de-France 2014–2019
21st-century women MEPs for France
Sciences Po alumni
People from Yvelines
Politicians from Île-de-France
MEPs for France 2009–2014
La République En Marche! politicians
Members of Parliament for Hauts-de-Seine